al-Mughayyir is a Palestinian village in the Ramallah and al-Bireh Governorate, located 27 kilometers Northeast of Ramallah and 34 kilometers Southeast of Nablus, in the northern West Bank. According to the Palestinian Central Bureau of Statistics (PCBS), the village had a population of 2,368 inhabitants in 2007.

Location
It is bordered by Fasayil to the east, Turmus'ayya and Khirbet Abu Falah  to the west, Duma and Jalud  to the north, and Kafr Malik and Al Auja to the south.

History
The  PEF's Survey of Western Palestine (SWP) found here "ancient cisterns, and a rock-cut winepress near the village, which is well built of hewn stone."

Potsherds from the Byzantine/Umayyad and Mamluk eras have been found here.

Ottoman era
In 1517, the village was included in the Ottoman empire with the rest of Palestine, appearing in the 1596 tax-records as Mugayyir, located in the Nahiya of Jabal Qubal, part of Nablus Sanjak. The population was 7 households and 9 bachelors, all Muslim. They paid taxes on wheat, barley,  summer crops, olive trees, occasional revenues, goats and beehives; a total of 4500 akçe. Potsherds from the early Ottoman era have also been found here.

In 1838 Edward Robinson noted el Mughaiyir located in El-Beitawy district, east of Nablus, while in 1852, he described the village as being of "considerable size", and built of hewn stones. He further noted that the villagers were "quite civil, and readily answered all our inquiries."

In 1870 Victor Guérin found it largely deserted by its inhabitants, for lack of drinking water. He especially noticed a small mosque, which had a number of regularly cut stones that seem ancient. There were also several caves, dug in rock, that also seemed old.

In 1882, the PEF's Survey of Western Palestine described it as "a small village of stone houses, on a ridge, with olives to the west, and beautiful corn-land in the Merj Sia. There is also corn-land on the north."

British Mandate era
In the 1922 census of Palestine conducted in 1922 by the British Mandate authorities, Mughair  had a population of 179, all Muslims, increasing in the 1931 census when El Mughaiyir had a population of 204, still all Muslims, in a total of 41 houses.

In the 1945 statistics, El Mughaiyir (including Khirbat Jib'it) had a population of 290 Muslims, with total of 33,903 dunams of land, according to an official land and population survey. Of this, 361 dunams were plantations and irrigable land, 6,908  used for cereals, while 34 dunams were built-up (urban) land.

Jordanian era
In the wake of the 1948 Arab–Israeli War, and after the 1949 Armistice Agreements, al-Mughayyir came under  Jordanian rule.

The Jordanian census of 1961 found 365 inhabitants.

1967-present
Since the Six-Day War in 1967, al-Mughayyir has been under Israeli occupation.

Impact of the Israeli Occupation
According to the Oslo II Interim Agreement signed between the Palestinian Liberation Organization (PLO) and Israel
in September 1995, Al Mughayyir village was divided into politically classified area 'B' and area 'C'. Approximately 1,934 dunums (5.9% of the village's total area) is classified as area B, where the Palestinian National Authority has complete control over civil matters and Israel continues to have overriding responsibility for security. Area B constitutes most of all inhabited Palestinian areas, including municipalities, villages and some refugee camps. The majority of the village's population resides in area B which forms a small part compared to the village's total area. The rest of the village's area, constituting 31,121 dunums (94.1% of the total area) is classified as area C, where Israel retains full control over security and administration related to the territory. In area C, Palestinian building and land management is prohibited unless through consent or authorization by the Israeli Civil Administration. Most of the lands lying within the area C are agricultural areas and open spaces, in addition to Israeli military camps. According to villagers 75% of its land has been confiscated for Israeli settlements, military bases and natural reserves.

On 12 November 2014, the al-Mughayyir mosque was damaged extensively when it was torched, reportedly by settlers in what was believed to be a price-tag attack.   According to Haaretz journalist Chaim Levinson, it was the tenth such mosque subject to arson in Israel and the West Bank since June 2011, and no investigation has ever led to an indictment.

On the November 25, 2018, another Price tag attack left 8  cars damaged, and graffiti stating "Death to the Arabs", "Revenge", and "Price Tag".

2019 death
On January 26, 2019, 38-year-old local resident Hamdy Taleb Na'asan was shot in the back and killed, and 10 other Palestinians were wounded. The Israeli army believed that Israeli settlers from Adei Ad had fired the shots. The head of the al-Mughayyir village council told Haaretz: "We're not entirely sure who has hit by military fire and who has hit by settler (shooting), but there undoubtedly are some hit by the settlers, who had attacked the houses unprovoked."  The Israeli settlers gave conflicting stories about how the disturbances started, but ended by telling that according to an Israeli hiker, claiming to stabbed, the altercation began some 200 meters from Adei Ad when three Arabs ambushed him and attempted to drag him to the village. The Israeli army expressed "doubts" that the teen was stabbed, while the Aa-Mughayyir villagers flatly denied it, and Yesh Din also said the settlers initiated the disturbances.

2020 death
In December 2020, Ali Ayman Abu Aliya, 13 years old, was killed during protests at  the village against "the construction of a Jewish settlement in the occupied West Bank". Abu Aliya was hit in the abdomen during clashes with the Israeli army, where the army had used 0.22-inch calibre Ruger ammunition. The UN Middle East envoy, Nickolay Mladenov, described the  killing as "shocking and unacceptable". According to the DCIP; "Ali did not present any threat to Israeli forces at the time he was killed".

Tree wars
According to The Economist in October 2009, 200 olive trees belonging to villagers from al-Mughayyir were felled by settlers from the illegal settler outpost at Adei Ad, near Shvut Rachel. October is harvest time for olives and is often a time of "tension between Palestinian farmers and Jewish settlers", and The Economist tied the destruction of trees to the settlers' 'price tag policy. 

In her 2009 publication entitled Tree Flags, legal scholar and ethnographer Irus Braverman describes how Palestinians identify olive groves as an emblem or symbol of their longtime, steadfast agricultural connection (tsumud) to the land.

"More than 80,000 Palestinian farmers derive a substantial portion of their annual income from olives. Harvesting the fruit, pressing the oil, selling and sharing the produce is a ritual of life."

In January 2019, twenty-five 35-year-old olive trees were cut down by vandals who left vehicle tracks leading to the nearby Israeli outpost of Mevo Shiloh, but no disciplinary action was taken by Israeli authorities.

Families
Principal families in the village include An Na'san, Dar abu Alya, Al Hajj Muhammad, Abu Na'im, and Abu Assaf.

Footnotes

Bibliography

External links
Welcome To al-Mughaiyir
  PIWP database profile
Survey of Western Palestine, Map 15:    IAA, Wikimedia commons 
Al-Mughayyir Fact Sheet, Applied Research Institute–Jerusalem, ARIJ
Al Mughayyir Village Profile, ARIJ,
Al-Mughayyir aerial photo, ARIJ
Locality Development Priorities and Needs in Al Mughayyir Village, ARIJ

Villages in the West Bank
Ramallah and al-Bireh Governorate
Municipalities of the State of Palestine